Senwes Cricket Stadium is a Cricket ground in Potchefstroom, North West Province, South Africa. It has hosted two Test matches, with the first in 2002. The Highveld Lions also play some home matches here.  It is also home to AFL South Africa, the Australian rules football, body responsible for developing the game in that country and the stadium is home to the South African national Australian rules football team, the Lions. On 29 October 2017, the venue hosted its first T20I match for South Africa against Bangladesh, which was the 100th T20I for South Africa.

As of 2008, due to a naming rights agreement, the ground was renamed to Senwes Park. It had been known as Sedgars Park.

See also
 List of Test cricket grounds

References

External links
Cricinfo's Senwes Park page

Cricket grounds in South Africa
Potchefstroom
Highveld Lions
Australian rules football in South Africa
Test cricket grounds in South Africa
Australian rules football grounds
Sports venues in North West (South African province)
2003 Cricket World Cup stadiums